Trans Nation Airways (officially Trans Nation Airways Pvt. Ltd. Co.) is a charter airline based in Addis Ababa, Ethiopia. It was established in 2004, following receipt of a Business Operating Certificate from the Ministry of Trade and an Air Operator Certificate from the Ethiopian Civil Aviation Authority. TNA is a member of the MIDROC Ethiopia Technology Group. The airline operates scheduled flights from its hub in Addis Ababa to various domestic destinations.

Fleet
The Trans Nation Airways fleet consists of the following aircraft (as of August 2019):

References

External links
Official website

Airlines of Ethiopia
Airlines established in 2004
Charter airlines
Transport in Addis Ababa
Companies based in Addis Ababa
2004 establishments in Ethiopia